Antanas Gustaitis (March 26, 1898 – October 16, 1941) was an officer in the Lithuanian Armed Forces who modernized the Lithuanian Air Force, which at that time was part of the Lithuanian Army.  He was the architect or aeronautical engineer who undertook the task to design and construct several military trainers and reconnaissance aircraft.

Gustaitis was born in the village of Obelinė, in Javaravas county, in the Marijampolė district. He attended high school in Yaroslavl, and from there studied at the Institute of Engineering and School of Artillery in Petrograd. After joining the Lithuanian Army in 1919, he graduated from the School of Military Aviation as a Junior Lieutenant in 1920. Later that year, he saw action in the Polish-Lithuanian War. By 1922 he began to train pilots, and later became the head of the training squadron. He also oversaw the construction of aircraft for Lithuania in Italy and Czechoslovakia. Gustaitis was one of the founding members of the Aero Club of Lithuania, and later its Vice-President. He did much to promote aviation among the young people in Lithuania, especially concerning the sport of gliding. He also won the Lithuanian Chess Championship in 1922.

Between 1925 and 1928, Gustaitis studied aeronautical engineering in Paris.  After his graduation he returned to Lithuania, and was promoted to deputy Commander-in-Chief of Military Aviation and made chief of the Aviation Workshop (Karo Aviacijos Tiekimo Skyrius) in Kaunas.  During this time, he reorganized the workshop and expanded its capability to repair aircraft as well. The aircraft he designed were named ANBO, an acronym for "Antanas Nori Būti Ore", which means Antanas wants to be in the air in Lithuanian.

In 1934, he became Commander-in-Chief of the air branch, and in 1937, attained the rank of Brigadier General. He reorganized Lithuanian military aviation, forming fighter, bomber, and reconnaissance groups, and developed a system of training for pilots and their crews, and ground crews as well.

After Lithuania's occupation by the Soviet Union and the dissolution of the Lithuanian Army, he was a lecturer at Vytautas Magnus University, but fearing arrest he attempted to flee to Germany in 1941. He was caught attempting to cross the border on 4 March, arrested, and taken to Moscow where he was shot on 16 October of that year.

Following the restoration of Lithuanian independence he was commemorated by Vilnius Gediminas Technical University when the  Antanas Gustaitis Aviation Institute was named after him.

Aircraft

References

 
 Lithuanian Aviation Museum

1898 births
1941 deaths
Lithuanian aerospace engineers
Lithuanian designers
Lithuanian aviators
Lithuanian chess players
Lithuanian generals
Lithuanian people executed by the Soviet Union
Lithuanian people of World War II
People from Marijampolė County
Academic staff of Vytautas Magnus University
People executed by the Soviet Union by firearm
20th-century chess players